Nosing may refer to:

 Stair nosing; the protruding edge of a stair
 The action of using one's nose to smell aromas; as in "nosing wine"
 To meddle or pry in another's personal business

Disambiguation pages